Triammatus saundersii is a species of beetle in the family Cerambycidae. It was described by Chevrolat in 1856. It is known from Borneo.

References

Lamiini
Beetles described in 1856